Patois (pl. same or ) is speech or language that is considered nonstandard, although the term is not formally defined in linguistics. As such, patois can refer to pidgins, creoles, dialects or vernaculars, but not commonly to jargon or slang, which are vocabulary-based forms of cant.

In colloquial usage of the term, especially in France, class distinctions are implied by the very meaning of the term, since in French, patois refers to any sociolect associated with uneducated rural classes, in contrast with the dominant prestige language (Standard French) spoken by the middle and high classes of cities or as used in literature and formal settings (the "acrolect").

Etymology

Examples
In France and other Francophone countries, patois has been used to describe non-standard French and regional languages such as Picard, Occitan and Franco-Provençal, since 1643 and Catalan after 1700, when the king Louis XIV banned its use. The word assumes the view of such languages being backward, countrified and unlettered, thus patois being potentially considered offensive when used by outsiders. Jean Jaurès said "one names patois the language of a defeated nation". In France and Switzerland, however, the term patois no longer holds any offensive connotation, and has indeed become a celebrated and distinguished variant of the numerous local tongues.

The vernacular form of English spoken in Jamaica is also referred to as Patois or Patwa. It is noted especially in reference to Jamaican Patois from 1934. Jamaican Patois language comprises words of the native languages of the many ethnic and cultural groups within the Caribbean including Spanish, Portuguese, Chinese, Amerindian and English along with several African languages. Some islands have Creole dialects influenced by their linguistic diversity; French, Spanish, Arabic, Hebrew, German, Dutch, Italian, Chinese, Vietnamese and others. Jamaican Patois is also spoken in Costa Rica and French Creole is spoken in Caribbean countries such as Trinidad and Tobago and Guyana in South America.

Often these patois are popularly considered "broken English" or slang, but cases such as Jamaican Patois are classified with more correctness as a Creole language; in fact, in the Francophone Caribbean the analogous term for local basilectal languages is créole (see also Jamaican English and Jamaican Creole). Antillean Creole, spoken in several present or formerly French islands of the Lesser Antilles, includes vocabulary and grammar of African and Carib origin, in addition to French.

Other examples of Patois include Trasianka, Sheng and Tsotsitaal. Patois has also been spoken by some Uruguay citizens, generally immigrants located in the south of Uruguay, mainly arriving from Italy and France, coming from Piedmont.

Synonyms

Dominican, Grenadian, St. Lucian, Trinidadian and Venezuelan speakers of Antillean Creole call the language patois. It is also named  in the Paria Peninsula of Venezuela and spoken since the eighteenth century by self-colonization of French people (from Corsica) and Caribbean people (from Martinique, Trinidad, Guadeloupe, Puerto Rico, Dominican Republic) who moved for cacao production.

Macanese Patois is also known as Patuá and was originally spoken by the Macanese community of the former Portuguese colony of Macau.

References

Sociolinguistics
Language varieties and styles
Linguistics terminology